Jonny Henderson is a British keyboard player most known for his work on the Hammond organ. He has been voted Keyboard Player of the Year in both the 2010 and 2011 British Blues Awards.

Since 2004, he has toured worldwide with blues guitarist Matt Schofield as part of the Matt Schofield Trio, and has performed on all of Schofield's albums to-date.  Henderson also plays regularly with the guitarist and singer Ian Siegal, on whose albums and DVDs he appears.

In 2009, Henderson released an instrumental funk/jazz album under his own name, entitled Where Did I Leave My Keys?

2016 saw him perform on Blueberry Pie, an album by Suzy Starlite and Simon Campbell of the Starlite Campbell Band.

Discography
2004: Matt Schofield - The Trio, Live
2005: Matt Schofield - Live at the Jazz Café
2005: Matt Schofield - Siftin' Thru' Ashes
2005: Ian Siegal - Meat & Potatoes
2006: Otis Grand - Hipster Blues
2007: Ian Siegal - Swagger
2007: Matt Schofield - Ear To The Ground
2009: Matt Schofield - Heads, Tails & Aces
2009: Ian Siegal - Broadside
2009: Jonny Henderson - Where Did I Leave My Keys?
2010: Matt Schofield - Live From the Archive
2011: Matt Schofield - Anything But Time
2016: Starlite Campbell Band - Blueberry Pie
2019: Eddie Martin - Thirst
2020: Starlite Campbell Band - The Language of Curiosity

Radio appearances
December 2005: BBC Radio 2 - Paul Jones' annual round up (with the Matt Schofield Trio)
June 2009: BBC Radio 2 - Paul Jones Rhythm and Blues Show (with the Matt Schofield Band)

References

External links
Jonny Henderson Official Site
Matt Schofield Official Site
Nugene Records site
Starlite Campbell Band Official Site
Review of Ian Siegal's album Meat And Potatoes
Review of Matt Schofield's album Heads, Tails and Aces

Year of birth missing (living people)
Living people
British keyboardists